San Agustin (formed 1996) is a free improvising trio from Atlanta, Georgia, United States, with David Daniell and Andrew Burnes on guitar and Bryan Fielden on drums.

San Agustin has recorded several live albums, and has recorded or performed with Suzanne Langille, Loren Mazzacane Connors, the Shaking Ray Levis, Daniel Carter, and Thurston Moore, among others.

Discography

Albums
2003 - Triangulation/Hoof and Mouth Blues - Table of the Elements TOE-LP-58 12"
2003 - The Expanding Sea - Table of the Elements SWC81 3xCD box set
1999 - Amokhali - Family Vineyard FV3 CD
1998 - Non-titled - Road Cone ROCO020 12" LP
1997 - Non-titled - Old Gold / Samizdat SMZ-1-OG-00 7"
1997 - January 1997 - Old Gold cassette

Collaborations
2002 - San Agustin with Suzanne Langille: Passing Song - Family Vineyard FV9 CDEP
1999 - Suzanne Langille, Andrew Burnes, David Daniell & Loren MazzaCane Connors: Let The Darkness Fall - Secretly Canadian SC026 CD

Compilation Appearances
2006 - A Field Guide to Table of the Elements (Southeast Edition)
San Agustin: "Embers"
also including Jonathan Kane, Arnold Dreyblatt, Zeena Parkins, Tony Conrad, Tony Conrad with Faust, Rhys Chatham, Leif Inge
Table of the Elements TOE-CD-90 2xCD compilation

External links
San Agustin Website
.

Free improvisation ensembles
American experimental musical groups